Shirley was an American Thoroughbred racehorse. Ridden by future U. S. Racing Hall of Fame inductee George Barbee, Shirley won the 1876 Preakness Stakes.

Background

Shirley was bred at Woodburn Stud by Alexander John Alexander. His father was the leading sire Lexington, and his dam was Miss Carter. Shirley was sold to Pierre Lorillard IV, and was trained by William Brown.

Racing Career

Ridden by jockey George Barbee, Shirley won the Preakness Stakes as a three-year-old.

Pedigree

References

Thoroughbred family 9-a
1873 racehorse births
Racehorses bred in the United States
Racehorses trained in the United States
Preakness Stakes winners
Byerley Turk sire line